Arnaud Hybois (born 26 January 1982 in Pontivy) is a French sprint canoeist who has competed since the late 2000s. He has won six medals at the ICF Canoe Sprint World Championships with three golds (K-2 200 m, K-4 1000 m: both 2010 and K-2 200 m in 2011), a silver (K-1 4 x 200 m, 2014) and two bronze (K-1 4 x 200 m: 2009, K-1 500 m 2013).

Hybois also competed in the K-1 500 m event at the 2008 Summer Olympics in Beijing, but was eliminated in the semifinals.  At the 2012 Summer Olympics, he and Sebastien Jouve came 4th in the K2-200 m.

References

External links
 
 
 
 

1982 births
Living people
People from Pontivy
Canoeists at the 2008 Summer Olympics
Canoeists at the 2012 Summer Olympics
Canoeists at the 2016 Summer Olympics
French male canoeists
Olympic canoeists of France
ICF Canoe Sprint World Championships medalists in kayak
Canoeists at the 2015 European Games
European Games competitors for France
Sportspeople from Morbihan